Prestwich-cum-Oldham (also known as Prestwich with Oldham) was an ancient ecclesiastical parish of the hundred of Salford, within the historic county boundaries of Lancashire, England. With the Parish Church of St Mary the Virgin, Prestwich as its centre, this parish encompassed a total of ten townships, and within them, several smaller chapelries.

Prestwich-cum-Oldham was divided into two non-contiguous sections: the townships of Great Heaton, Little Heaton, Pilkington, and Prestwich on the west; Alkrington, Tonge, Chadderton, Crompton, Oldham and Royton on the east. The parish of Middleton divided these two portions of Prestwich-cum-Oldham from north to south. The parish covered  and was noted in 1851 to have a population of 94,470, and again in 1861, to have 117,987.

History

The parish of Prestwich-cum-Oldham has "no united history", and instead was a loose affiliation of rural townships between the South Pennines and West Pennine Moors that had one early-medieval church building between them. Prestwich-cum-Oldham traces its existence to the colony of priests whose presence gave Prestwich its name, as well as tithes, levies and terms of land-tenure related to the ancient Royal Manor of Tottington, a unit used for governance in the manorial system that spanned most of the territory. Manorialism in the parish was comparatively weak when compared nationally; ruling families were either non-resident or of "only local importance". An exception was the Pilkingtons, from the western portion of the parish, who ranked "among the great families of the county". Their military allegiance to Richard III and the House of York during the Wars of the Roses, though, brought about their overthrow in the late-15th century.

The rector of Prestwich-cum-Oldham "was at first reluctantly compliant and then an avowed opponent" of the Elizabethan Religious Settlement of 1559. There is, though, little other evidence of opposition to the English Reformation and the established church. Nevertheless, it is one of only a few parishes in England in which any resistance occurred; there was a show of popular support for the abolition of the Book of Common Prayer and Episcopal polity in favour of Presbyterian polity supported by presbyters in the parish of Manchester. By 1662, the rector of Prestwich-cum-Oldham complied with Anglicanism, but the curate of Oldham, St Mary's was expelled for preaching nonconformism; chapels at Stand and Greenacres span virtually the whole history of non-conformity in the United Kingdom, as does a Quaker meeting-house at Royton.

The parish remained comparatively rural until the Industrial Revolution; some townships, such as Royton, had primitive domestic manufactories and traded goods at the markets in Rochdale and Manchester. The introduction of the factory system to Oldham, Chadderton, Crompton and Royton led to the demise of arable land via rapid urbanisation and industrialisation. This gave rise to the eastern portion as the dominant partner of the parish, despite it being under the authority of the church at Prestwich.

Objections to Prestwich's dominance of the parish existed from an early time; there had been a chapel of ease at Crompton since at least the early 16th century but, due to ecclesiastical arrangements in Prestwich-cum-Oldham, the inhabitants were obliged to contribute money towards Oldham Church, which in turn had obligation to the mother Church of St Mary the Virgin at Prestwich. On several occasions during the 15th and 16th centuries, the Archdeacon of the Chester had to intervene because Crompton's inhabitants refused to contribute monies towards holy bread and candles used at Prestwich.

The Parish of Prestwich-cum-Oldham was dissolved in the 20th century.

Churches and rituals

 Prestwich-cum-Oldham lay within the Diocese of Lichfield until 1541, when this diocese was divided and Prestwich-cum-Oldham became part of the Diocese of Chester. This in turn was divided in 1847 when the present Diocese of Manchester was created.

Many of Prestwich-cum-Oldham's townships had no medieval church of their own. For baptisms, marriages and burials, the people had to travel to St Mary's, Prestwich, or else churches that lay outside the parish boundaries, such as St Leonard's, Middleton. Oldham, though remaining nominally a chapelry into the 20th century, effectively secured independence for the eastern portion of Prestwich-cum-Oldham.

Constituent areas

Prestwich-cum-Oldham comprised ten townships during the greater part of its history. These were not static, and changed according to the construction of churches and chapels and increases in population. Similarly, Prestwich-cum-Oldham was later split into two separate parishes of Prestwich and Oldham.

The area of the whole is 22,022½ acres. The geology of the entire parish is represented by the Coal Measures, and on the eastward side of a line drawn from High Crompton to Greenacres, of the Lower Coal Measures or Gannister Beds.

Daughter parishes

Prestwich-cum-Oldham was split into some forty-one daughter parishes, which can be found at The Prestwich Guide - History.

Neighbouring parishes

See also
Prestwich (UK Parliament constituency)

References

Notes

Bibliography

External links 
Map of parish of Prestwich-cum-Oldham in the mid 1800s

History of Lancashire
History of the Metropolitan Borough of Bury
History of the Metropolitan Borough of Oldham
Prestwich
Chadderton